Sri Krishna Arts and Science College, also known as the SKASC Coimbatore, was established by the V.L.B. Trust in 1997 and is an ISO certified co-educational institution.

SKASC has 24-hour internet access. It has science labs equipped with IBM servers. The campus library covers 30,000 sq. ft. with reference sections, group study cells, video conference rooms and a research scholars' room.

SKASC provides furnished on-campus dormitories for boys and girls.

SKASC provides a 24/7 e-Learning facility. This virtual classroom can be accessed by students and staff any time anywhere.

Notable alumni
 Aparna Das, South Indian film actress
 Karthik Venugopal, director of Nenjamundu Nermaiyundu Odu Raja
 Diya menon, T.V. host & VJ

References 

"MyklassRoom" is a non successful application.

External links 
 

Universities and colleges in Coimbatore
Educational institutions established in 1997
1997 establishments in Tamil Nadu